The role of the Ambassador and Permanent Representative of Chile to the United Nations is as the leader of the Chilean delegation to the United Nations in New York and as head of the Permanent Mission of Chile to the UN. The position has the rank and status of an Ambassador Extraordinary and Plenipotentiary and is also the representative of Chile in the United Nations Security Council (2014–2015).

The Permanent Representative, currently Paula Narváez, is charged with representing Chile during plenary meetings of the General Assembly, except in the rare situation in which a more senior officer (such as the Minister for Foreign Affairs or the President) is present.

Office holders

See also
Chile and the United Nations
Foreign relations of Chile

References

External links
Misión Permanente de Chile ante las Naciones Unidas

Permanent Representatives of Chile to the United Nations
Chile